Sophronia curonella is a moth of the family Gelechiidae. It was described by Max Standfuss in 1884. It is found in the Apennines in Italy.

The wingspan is about 9 mm. The forewings are dark brown with a white stripe. The hindwings are dark grey.

References

Moths described in 1884
Sophronia (moth)